Blue Man Cape (or Blueman Cape) is a peninsula in the Qikiqtaaluk Region, Nunavut, Canada. It is located on Ellesmere Island.

References

Peninsulas of Qikiqtaaluk Region
Ellesmere Island